
Year 460 (CDLX) was a leap year starting on Friday (link will display the full calendar) of the Julian calendar. At the time, it was known as the Year of the Consulship of Magnus and Apollonius (or, less frequently, year 1213 Ab urbe condita). The denomination 460 for this year has been used since the early medieval period, when the Anno Domini calendar era became the prevalent method in Europe for naming years.

Events 
 By place 

 Roman Empire 
 Emperor Majorian gathers an expeditionary force (Alans and other barbarians) in Liguria, and enters Aquitaine after a long march, where he visits King Theodoric II at Toulouse.
 Majorian invades Hispania; his generals Nepotianus and Sunieric lead a Visigoth army into Gallaecia. The Suebi are defeated and Lusitania (modern Portugal) is conquered.  
 King Genseric, fearing a Roman invasion, tries to negotiate a peace with Majorian, who refuses. The Vandals devastate Mauretania and Moorish warriors poison the wells.
 Majorian assembles a large fleet in Nova Carthago (Cartagena) in preparation for an invasion of the Vandal Kingdom in Africa. However, King Genseric organizes an attack on the fleet, using individuals sympathetic to the Vandals to conduct the raid. The fleet is destroyed and the expedition is abandoned.
 Emperor Leo I founds the Excubitors (imperial guard) at Constantinople; this elite tagmatic unit (300 men) is recruited from among the warlike Isaurians (approximate date).

 Europe 
 March 27 (night) – Swabians invade the Gallic city of Lugo. The governor is killed.

 Asia 
 The Hepthalites (White Huns) conquer the remnants of the Kushan Empire and enter India.
 A famine that will last for several years begins in the Persian Empire (approximate date).

 By topic 

 Art 
 The remodeling of the dome of Baptistry of Neon at Ravenna (Italy) is finished.
 The Ajanta Caves (India) are completed (cut into the volcanic rock and elaborately painted).
 The seated Buddha in the Yungang Grottoes, Datong (Shanxi), is made (approximate date).

 Religion 
 The Coptic Orthodox Church (Egypt) splits from the Chalcedonian Orthodox Church of Alexandria.
 Gennadius I, patriarch of Constantinople, banishes Timothy II, patriarch of Alexandria.

Births 
 Budic II, king of Brittany (approximate date)
 Hilderic, king of the Vandals and Alans (approximate date)
 Romulus Augustulus, last emperor of the Western Roman Empire (approximate date)

Deaths 
 October 20 – Aelia Eudocia, Roman empress and wife of Theodosius II
 Ardaric, king of the Gepids (approximate date)
 Juqu Anzhou, prince of the Chinese Xiongnu states Northern Liang

References